Vladimir Kostitsyn (born 2 July 1945) is a Russian geophysicist. He attended at the Perm State University. Kostitsyn served as a full-time member of the Russian Academy of Natural Sciences since 1997. He was honored the Medal of the Order "For Merit to the Fatherland" and Honored Worker of the Higher School of the Russian Federation.

References 

1945 births
Living people
People from Kirov Oblast
Russian geophysicists
Honorary Members of the Russian Academy of Natural Sciences
Full Members of the Russian Academy of Sciences
Recipients of the Medal of the Order "For Merit to the Fatherland" II class
Perm State University alumni